Vikebygd may refer to:

Places
Vikebygd, a village in Vindafjord municipality, Rogaland county, Norway
Vikebygd Church, a church in Vindafjord municipality, Rogaland county, Norway
Vikebygd (municipality), a former municipality in the old Hordaland county, Norway
Vikebygd, Ullensvang, a village in Ullensvang municipality in Vestland county, Norway